Purnima Verma (born 25 November 1960) is a political and social worker and a Member of Parliament elected from the Mohanlalganj constituency in the Indian  state of Uttar Pradesh being a Bharatiya Janta Party candidate.

Early life
Purnima was born on 25 November 1960 in Kanpur (Uttar Pradesh).
She married Shripal Verma 10 May 1973 and has three sons and a daughter.

Education and career
Purnima was educated at Rohilkhand University, Bareilly. She was elected to the 11th Lok Sabha in 1996.

Interests and social activities
Purnima has been involved in social service, welfare of women, child and youth development and women & child education. She spends her time reading books and participating in social programmes along with working on the development work in the constituency and participation in political activities.

References

India MPs 1996–1997
Women in Uttar Pradesh politics
Articles created or expanded during Women's History Month (India) - 2014
People from Kanpur
1960 births
Living people
Lok Sabha members from Uttar Pradesh
20th-century Indian women politicians
20th-century Indian politicians
People from Lucknow district
Bharatiya Janata Party politicians from Uttar Pradesh